The RQ-3 DarkStar (known as Tier III- or "Tier three minus" during development) is an unmanned aerial vehicle (UAV). Its first flight was on March 29, 1996. The Department of Defense terminated DarkStar in January 1999, after determining the UAV was not aerodynamically stable and was not meeting cost and performance objectives.

Design and development 
The RQ-3 DarkStar was designed as a "high-altitude endurance UAV", and incorporated stealth aircraft technology to make it difficult to detect, which allowed it to operate within heavily defended airspace, unlike the Northrop Grumman RQ-4 Global Hawk, which is unable to operate except under conditions of air supremacy. The DarkStar was fully autonomous: it could take off, fly to its target, operate its sensors, transmit information, return and land without human intervention. Human operators, however, could change the DarkStar's flight plan and sensor orientation through radio or satellite relay. The RQ-3 carried either an optical sensor or radar, and could send digital information to a satellite while still in flight. It used a single airbreathing jet engine of unknown type for propulsion. One source claims it used a Williams-Rolls-Royce FJ44-1A turbofan engine.

The first prototype made its first flight on March 29, 1996, but its second flight, on April 22, 1996, ended in a crash shortly after takeoff. A modified, more stable design (the RQ-3A) first flew on June 29, 1998, and made a total of five flights before the program was canceled just prior to the sixth and final flight planned for the airworthiness test phase. Two additional RQ-3As were built, but never made any flights before program cancellation.

Although the RQ-3 was terminated on January 28, 1999, a July 2003 Aviation Week and Space Technology article reported that April 2003 that a derivative of the RQ-3 had been used in the 2003 invasion of Iraq. There has been no independent confirmation.

The "R" is the Department of Defense designation for reconnaissance; "Q" means unmanned aircraft system. The "3" refers to it being the third of a series of purpose-built unmanned reconnaissance aircraft systems.

Survivors
The second RQ-3A (A/V #2) is at the National Museum of the United States Air Force at Wright-Patterson AFB in Dayton, Ohio. Although part of the Museum's Research & Development Gallery, it is displayed hanging over the C-130E in Building 4's Global Reach Gallery.
The third RQ-3A (A/V #3) is on display in the Great Gallery of the Museum of Flight in Seattle, Washington.
The fourth RQ-3A (which never flew before the program ended) is held by the Smithsonian National Air and Space Museum in Washington, D.C., but is not on display.

Specifications

See also

Sources
 Specifications and second and third paragraphs: Display information on exhibit at Museum of Flight in Seattle, Washington, United States.

References

External links 

 DarkStar Tier III- from NASA Dryden Flight Center
 DarkStar Tier III Minus

Q-003
1990s United States military reconnaissance aircraft
Unmanned military aircraft of the United States
Single-engined jet aircraft
Tailless aircraft
Unmanned stealth aircraft
Cancelled military aircraft projects of the United States
Aircraft first flown in 1996
High-altitude and long endurance aircraft